Robert Gass (born 1948), is a leadership coach and organizational consultant, seminar leader and rock musician. He holds a doctorate in Organizational and Clinical Psychology from Harvard University. He is known for his work in leadership development, organizational transformation, and building social movements. and is a former President of ARC International Consulting, a global consulting and training company specializing in transformational change. He co-founded the Rockwood Art of Leadership trainings which coaches environmental, social justice and human rights leaders across North America, in leadership. He is also co-founder of the Social Transformation Project and a  former Board Chair of Greenpeace. Gass has coached leaders and organizations such as the Sierra Club, the NAACP, Amnesty International, MoveOn.org, Service Employees International Union (SEIU) the National Congress of American Indians, 350.org, National Domestic Workers Union, Greenpeace International, and the Obama White House.

He lives in Boulder County, Colorado with his partner of 50 years, Judith Ansara and has three children.

Music
As a composer, performer and recording artist, Gass has released twenty two albums of music in various genres including classical, psychedelic rock (as Bob Gass) and sacred chant.

Discography
Kirtana 2007  (Spring Hill Music)
Bliss Om Namaha Shivaya: 2005 (Spring Hill Music)
Awakening 2003 (Spring Hill Music)
Enchanted 2000
Chant 1999
Baptism with Bead Game 1996 (American Sound)
Ancient Mother 1995
Medicine Wheel 1994
Living with Loss (guided meditation & music) 1993
Songs of Healing 1992
Opening the Heart (guided meditation & music) 1991
Heart of Perfect Wisdom 1990
Pilgrimage 1990
Gloria 1989
From the Goddess/O Great Spirit 1988
Alleulia/Kyrie 1987
Om Namaha Shivaya 1986
Trust in Love 1981 (Philo/Spring Hill Music)
Many Blessings 1980 (Philo/Spring Hill Music)
On Wings of Song 1976 (Spring Hill Music)
Freedom Express 1970 (Mercury), credited as Bob Gass
Welcome with Bead Game 1970 (Avco-Embassy/Fallout)

References

External links

Place of birth missing (living people)
Harvard Graduate School of Arts and Sciences alumni
Musicians from Boulder, Colorado
American consultants
American male composers
21st-century American composers
Living people
1948 births
21st-century American male musicians